Crossword Puzzle is the seventh and penultimate studio album by The Partridge Family. Released in June 1973, it was the last Partridge Family album to chart in the US, entering Billboard's Top LP's chart in July and peaking at no. 167 in its second of just five weeks in the Top 200. Bell Records, losing faith in the group after oversaturating the market with product, chose not to release a US single from the album, though "Sunshine" was released as a single in Japan.

The LP cover featured a crossword puzzle, with the answers given inside on one side of the dust sleeve. As with previous release The Partridge Family Notebook, the American album cover of Crossword Puzzle included no group photo, but did feature small black-and-white photos of Shirley Jones (at left) and David Cassidy (at right).

In 2003 the album was released on CD on Arista's BMG Heritage Records label.

Track listing
All tracks, except "It's A Long Way To Heaven", "Now That You Got Me Where You Want Me" and "Let Your Love Go", were featured on the TV show (mainly from Season 3).

Personnel

 John Bahler -  vocal arrangement, background vocals
 Tom Bahler - background vocals
 Stan Farber - background vocals - uncredited (A6)
 Jerry Whitman - background vocals - uncredited (B2)
 Max Bennett - bass
 Hal Blaine - drums
 Dennis Budimir - guitar
 Larry Carlton - guitar
 David Cassidy - vocals
 Pete Ciccone - re-design
 Wes Farrell - rhythm arrangements
 Elliott Federman - mastering
 Mike Hartry - digital transfers
 Ron Hicklin - background vocals
 Jeremy Holiday - production coordination
 John Hudson - product manager
 Shirley Jones - vocals
 Larry Knechtel - keyboards
 Bob Kovach - engineer
 Mike Melvoin - string and horn arrangements, keyboards
 Joe Osborn - bass
 Rob Santos - re-issue producer
 Louie Shelton - guitar
 Lisa Sutton - liner notes
 Tommy Tedesco - guitar
 Jackie Ward - background vocals
 Beverly Weinstein - art direction
 Winston Wong - assistant engineer

Track information and credits adapted from AllMusic

Releases
 CD	Crossword Puzzle Buddha Records	 2001
 CD	Crossword Puzzle BMG Heritage	 2003
 CD	Crossword Puzzle Sbme Special Mkts.	 2008
 CD	Crossword Puzzle BMG Heritage

Recording dates
4 September 1971
"As Long As There's You"
"Come On Love"

1 May 1972
"One Day at a Time"
"It Means I'm in Love with You" (see 23 May 1972)
"It Sounds Like You're Saying Hello"
"It's You"

23 May 1972
"It Means I’m In Love With You" (Re-Record, see 1 May 1972)

4 September 1972
"Sunshine"
"Let Your Love Go"

22 September 1972
"It's a Long Way to Heaven"
"Now That You’ve Got Me Where You Want Me"
"I've Got Your Love All Over Me"

See recording dates for this and other Partridge Family albums at The Partridge Family Recording Sessions

Charts

References

The Partridge Family albums
1973 albums
Albums arranged by Mike Melvoin
Albums produced by Wes Farrell
Bell Records albums
Albums recorded at United Western Recorders